The 1916–17 Luxembourg National Division was the 7th season of top level association football in Luxembourg.

Overview
It was contested by 6 teams, and US Hollerich Bonnevoie won the championship.

League standings

Results

References
Luxembourg - List of final tables (RSSSF)

1916-17
1916–17 in European association football leagues
Nat